Anton-Bruckner-Gymasium Straubing is the largest of four gymnasiums of Straubing in Bavaria by the number of students, the others being Johannes-Turmair-Gymnasium, Ludwigsgymnasium and Gymnasium der Ursulinen-Schulstiftung. It consists of a music and an economics branch.

History
The school was established in 1824 as a teachers' training college. It was founded by Royal Decree of 4 September 1823 at the Jesuit College Straubinger on 1 November 1824, and expanded in 1833 by the construction of a residential building. In 1843, it moved to the former canon St. Jakob in Seminargasse.
 
In 1924, the college was declared a college of further education. In 1935, it was changed into the Deutsche Aufbauschule Straubing with 240 students. In 1953, it became a teacher training college again whilst retaining its secondary school activities. In 1956, the teacher training was relocated to Regensburg. In 1961, a new school building was opened.

In 1965, its name was changed to Anton-Bruckner-Gymnasium and the music branch was established. In 1976, the economics branch was added.

Notable alumni
 Elli Erl, singer
 Gerold Huber, pianist
 Siegfried Mauser, pianist
 Kurt Raab, actor
 Peer Raben, composer
 Markus Weinzierl, football coach and former player

References

External links 
 Website of Anton-Bruckner-Gymnasiums Straubing

Schools in Bavaria
Straubing
Educational institutions established in 1824
1824 establishments in Bavaria